Walta is an Ethiopian commercial media conglomerate

Walta may also refer to:

 Walta (Dogu'a Tembien), a municipality of Ethiopia
 Walta TV, an Ethiopian television network
 Leo Walta, a Finnish professional footballer

See also 
 Valta (disambiguation)